1,3-Dimethoxybenzene is an organic compound with the formula C6H4(OCH3)2. It is one of three isomers of dimethoxybenzene.

Uses 
1,3-Dimethoxybenzene has been used in the synthesis of novel oxathiane spiroketal donors.

Related compounds 

 1,2-Dimethoxybenzene
 1,4-Dimethoxybenzene
 Methyl isoeugenol

References 

O-methylated natural phenols